Greece-Mexico relations are the historical and current bilateral relations between the Hellenic Republic and the United Mexican States. Both nations are members of the Organisation for Economic Co-operation and Development and the United Nations.

History 
Diplomatic relations between Greece and Mexico were established on the 17 May 1938 immediately after the signing of the Treaty of Friendship between both nations. Between 1955 and 1964 diplomatic relations were carried out between Mexico's embassy in Rome, Italy and Greece's embassy in Washington, D.C., United States; and through their respective honorary consulates.

In 1963, President Adolfo López Mateos became the first Mexican head-of-state to visit Greece. In 1965 resident embassies were established in each other's capitals. In May 1986, Mexican Foreign Secretary Bernardo Sepúlveda Amor paid a visit to Greece to sign bilateral agreements between both nations. In August 1986, Greek Prime Minister Andreas Papandreou paid an official visit to Mexico, becoming the first Greek head-of-government to visit the nation. In 1991, Greek Foreign Minister (and future Prime Minister) Antonis Samaras paid a visit to Mexico. There have been several additional visits by foreign ministers of both nations thus strengthening their bilateral relationship.

In August 2016, shots were fired at the Mexican Embassy in Athens. In February 2020, a Mexico-Greece Friendship Group was installed in the Mexican Chamber of Deputies; which will focus on the protection of cultural assets against climate change and the illegal trafficking of archaeological pieces.

High-level visits

High-level visits from Greece to Mexico
 Prime Minister Andreas Papandreou (1986)
 Foreign Minister Antonis Samaras (1991)
 Foreign Minister Theodoros Pangalos (1998)

High-level visits from Mexico to Greece
 President Adolfo López Mateos (1963)
 Foreign Secretary Bernardo Sepúlveda Amor (1986)
 Foreign Secretary Fernando Solana (1992)
 Foreign Secretary Rosario Green (1999)
 Foreign Undersecretary Juan Rebolledo (1999)
 Foreign Secretary Luis Ernesto Derbez (2003)
 Foreign Secretary Patricia Espinosa (2012)

Bilateral relations
Both nations have signed several bilateral agreements such as a Treaty of Friendship (1938); Agreement on Education and Cultural Cooperation (1982); Agreement of Cooperation in Tourism (1992); Agreement on Scientific and Technical Cooperation (1999); Extradition Treaty (1999); Agreement in Scientific and Technological Cooperation (1999); Agreement on Mutual Legal Assistance in Criminal Matters (1999); Agreement on the Promotion and Protection of Investments (2000); Trade Agreement (2000); Agreement on the Avoidance of Double-Taxation and Tax Evasion (2004) and a Memorandum of Understanding between both nations Diplomatic Institutions (2009).

Trade relations 

In 2000, Mexico signed a Free Trade Agreement with the European Union (which includes Greece). Since 2000, trade between the two countries has grown considerably. In 2018, two-way trade between both nations amounted to US$217 million. Greek exports to Mexico include: parts and accessories for watt meters; razors and blades. Mexican exports to Greece include: tequila, process units, chickpea, memory units and malt beer. Greece's total cumulative investment in Mexico between 1999 and 2016 was $1.3 million.

Resident diplomatic missions 
 Greece has an embassy in Mexico City 
 Mexico has an embassy in Athens.

Country comparison

See also 
 Greek Mexicans
 Mexico–EU relations

References 

 
Mexico
Greece